Bongo Flava (or Bongoflava) is a nickname for Tanzanian music. The genre developed in the 1990s, mainly as a derivative of American hip hop and traditional Tanzanian styles such as taarab and dansi, with additional influences from reggae, R&B, and afrobeats, to form a unique style of music. Lyrics are usually in Swahili or English, although increasingly there has been limited use of words from Nigerian languages due to the influence of afrobeats.

Etymology 

The name "Bongo" of Bongo Flava comes from Kiswahili usually meaning brains, intelligence, cleverness but can also mean mentally deranged. Bongo is the augmentative form of Ubongo, Kiswahili for Brainland. Flava is kiswahili for Flavour. Ubongo is a term originally use, and in Tanzania still used, for the city of Dar es Salaam. Outside Tanzania, Ubongo is often referring to Tanzania. Ubongo as a term originated from a speech by President Nyerere in the late 70's during a very difficult time following both the global fuel shocks of the 70's and the Kagera war against Uganda. Mwalimu Nyerere spoke that only a nation using brains (using Kiswahili Ubongo for Brainland) could, and would, overcome the difficult challenges Tanzania was facing. Unfortunately things became even worse for Tanzania, and by the early 1980's Dar es Salaam was calling itself mostly by the name Jua Kali (hot sun/world is spinning/dizzy) but also Ubongo. The term Ubongo was being used as a clever way to say both, survival in Dar es Salaam required brains and intelligence, but was also full of mentally deranged people.

In 1981 musician Remmy Ongala founded a band called Matimila. Each band has a unique mtindo (style/fashion) and Remmy Ongala's band Matimila named their mtindo "Bongo". Remmy Ongala would become the most famous musician ever for Tanzania, reaching global fame working with English singer Peter Gabriel.

History 
Bongo Flava is a large divergent evolution of muziki wa kizazi kipya, meaning "music of the new generations", which originated in the uzunguni of Dar es Salaam between the mid 1980s and 1990s. Taji Liundi, also known as Master T, the original creator and producer of the Dj Show program had already started airing songs by fledgling local artists by late 1994. Radio hosts Mike Muhagama and Taji Liundi led the way in radio support of local artists. Mike Mhagama eventually joined the popular program as an under-study to Taji Liundi and also went on to produce and present the show alone after Taji Liundi left Radio One in 1996.

"Bongo Flava" existed well before the first audio or video recordings. The youth in Dar es Salaam were rapping at beach concerts (organized by Joseph Kusaga and Ruge Mutahaba, who together own Mawingu Discotheque, Mawingu Studios and now Clouds Media Group), local concert halls and taking part in the first official rap competition called Yo! Rap Bonanza series that were promoted by Abdulhakim "DJ Kim" Magomelo under his promotion company "Kim & The Boyz".

Some of the youth were organized with fancy names, some were solo or formed impromptu groups at the event to get a chance to perform. An icon of the open performance artists in the early 1990s was Adili or Nigga One. The first influential dub artiste of the genre was Saleh Jabir who rapped in Kiswahili over the instrumentals of Vanilla Ice's, "Ice Ice Baby", he was solely responsible for making Kiswahili a viable language to rap in. His version was so popular, it broke ranks by receiving mild airplay in the conservative National Radio Tanzania, thus making the first rap song on Tanzanian radio.

One of the earliest groups to actually record and deliver a CD to Radio One for airing was Mawingu Band, an outfit that became hugely popular in early 1994. They recorded at Mawingu Studios. Its members were Othman Njaidi, Eliudi Pemba, Columba Mwingira, Sindila Assey, Angela, Robert Chuwa, Boniface Kilosa (a.k.a. Dj Boni Love) and later Pamela who sang the famous hook of their breakthrough first RnB/Rap single "Oya Msela". The song was so popular and ahead of its time that the Msela label stuck. 'Msela' is the Swahili word for 'ruffian'.

Bongo Flava popular artists include  Vanessa Mdee (Vee Money), Bill Nass, Diamond Platnumz, Harmonize, Jux, Alikiba, Shetta, Ben Pol, Lava Lava, Dully Sykes, Rich Mavoko, Rayvanny, Nandy. Marioo, Mavokali, Zuchu, Mwana FA

Popularity
Today, "Bongo Flava" is the most popular musical style amongst the Tanzanian youth, something that is also reflected in the vast number of TV and radio programs dedicated to this genre as well as the sales figures of bongo flava albums.

Outside of its historical home of Tanzania, Bongo Flava has become a resoundingly popular sound in neighboring, culturally related countries such as Kenya and Uganda. Bongo Flava has even found a home outside of the African continent; the most popular artists in the genre have recently begun to address Western markets and the self-proclaimed "best internet station for Bongo Flava," Bongo Radio, happens to be based out of Chicago, Illinois. There are now also playlists dedicate to the genre of global streaming platforms such as iTunes and Spotify, increasing Bongo-Flava's visibility.

Despite the popularity of "Bongo Flava" and the large number of well-known artists throughout Tanzania, copying of music is widespread due to the weak  enforcement of copyright laws, and most artistes are unable to make a living selling their music. Instead, most rely on income from live performances to support themselves, or income from other business ventures, using their social influence as leverage. However, there are instances of 'success stories', the career of artist Diamond Platnumz, and producer-artist Nahreel are often cited as sources of inspiration for many artists and producers

Characteristics
While "Bongo Flava" is clearly related to American hip hop, it is also clearly distinguished from its Western counterpart. As the bongoflava.net website puts it, "these guys don't need to copy their brothers in America, but have a sure clear sense of who they are and what sound it is they're making". The sound "has its roots in the rap, R&B and hip hop coming from America, but from the beginning, these styles have been pulled apart and put back together with African hands". Recently, with the increase in popularity of Afrobeats in East Africa most Bongo flava songs have adopted the sound especially the 3+2 or 2+3 drum pattern of afrobeats but retaining the arabesque melodies of taarab thus resulting to a reduction of hiphop influence in the genre.

The typical "Bongo Flava" artist identifies with the mselah. It is in this sense that, for example, members of the hip hop crew Afande Sele call themselves watu pori, i.e., "men of the savannah". A sort of manifesto of mselah ideology is given by the song Mselah Jela by Bongo flava singer Juma Nature, who defines the mselah, amongst other things, as an "honest person of sincere heart". Following the tradition of western hip hop (as represented by the pioneering hip hop group Afrika Bambaataa), bongo flava lyrics usually tackle social and political issues such as poverty, political corruption, superstition, and HIV/AIDS, often with a more or less explicit educational intent, an approach that is sometimes referred to as "edutainment". Afande Sele, for example, have written songs that are intended to teach prevention of malaria and HIV. However, this has changed in recent years and increasingly many commercial Bongo Flava songs deal with topics such as love, heartbreak, success and hardship. This change in topic remains a point of contention between the earlier generation who saw the rise of Bongo Flava, and the new generation who tend to prefer catchy and club ready songs. Whether this is due to globalisation and western influence or due to a change in listener's taste, is the question at the centre of the debate. Some Bongo groups are very popular within their ethnic group; one example is the Maasai X Plastaz who developed their own subgenre known as "Maasai hip hop".

See also
 Music of Tanzania
 Zenji flava
 Afrobeats
 Afroswing

References

External links
Bongo Flava Songs

21st-century music genres
Tanzanian hip hop
1990s in music
African music genres
Hip hop genres